Luke Nicholas Tenuta (born September 1, 1999) is an American football offensive tackle for the Green Bay Packers of the National Football League (NFL). He played college football at Virginia Tech, and was selected by the Buffalo Bills in the sixth round of the 2022 NFL Draft. He has also played for the Indianapolis Colts.

Professional career

Buffalo Bills
Tenuta was selected in the sixth round, 209th overall, of the 2022 NFL Draft by the Buffalo Bills. On August 30, 2022, he was released by the Bills.

Indianapolis Colts
On August 31, 2022, Tenuta was claimed off waivers by the Indianapolis Colts. On October 15, 2022, Tenuta was waived.

Green Bay Packers
On October 18, 2022, Tenuta was claimed off waivers by the Green Bay Packers. He saw his first NFL action on December 25, 2022, playing four special teams snaps in a Week 16 victory over the Miami Dolphins.

References

External links
 Green Bay Packers bio
 Virginia Tech Hokies bio

1999 births
Living people
American football offensive tackles
Virginia Tech Hokies football players
Buffalo Bills players
Indianapolis Colts players
Green Bay Packers players